James Edmonds (born June 4, 1938) is an American rower. He competed in the men's coxless pair event at the 1964 Summer Olympics.

References

1938 births
Living people
American male rowers
Olympic rowers of the United States
Rowers at the 1964 Summer Olympics
Sportspeople from Elmira, New York
Pan American Games medalists in rowing
Pan American Games gold medalists for the United States
Rowers at the 1959 Pan American Games